= Ent-isokaurene C2-hydroxylase =

Class of enzymes

Identifiers
- EC no.: 1.14.13.143

Databases
- IntEnz: IntEnz view
- BRENDA: BRENDA entry
- ExPASy: NiceZyme view
- KEGG: KEGG entry
- MetaCyc: metabolic pathway
- PRIAM: profile
- PDB structures: RCSB PDB PDBe PDBsum
Search
- PMC: articles
- PubMed: articles
- NCBI: proteins

Ent-isokaurene C2-hydroxylase (EC 1.14.13.143, CYP71Z6) is an enzyme with systematic name ent-isokaurene,NADPH:oxygen oxidoreductase (hydroxylating). This enzyme catalyses the following chemical reaction

ent-isokaurene + O_{2} + NADPH + H^{+} $\rightleftharpoons$ ent-2alpha-hydroxyisokaurene + H_{2}O + NADP^{+}

Ent-isokaurene C2-hydroxylase performs the initial step in the conversion of ent-isokaurene to the antibacterial oryzalides in rice, Oryza sativa.
